Mount Talang is an active stratovolcano  in West Sumatra, Indonesia.

According to the Smithsonian Institution Global Volcanism Program, Mount Talang has had eight confirmed eruptions between 1833 and 1968. A minor eruption followed in April 2005, over 25,000 inhabitants of the local area being evacuated due to fears of further volcanic eruptions. Geologists say that the eruption in April 2005 is connected to the devastating December 2004 Indian Ocean earthquake.

The pitcher plant Nepenthes talangensis is named after the mountain and is thought to be endemic to its upper slopes.

See also
 List of volcanoes in Indonesia
 2004 Indian Ocean earthquake and tsunami

References

Stratovolcanoes of Indonesia
Subduction volcanoes
Active volcanoes of Indonesia
Volcanoes of Sumatra
Mountains of Sumatra
Volcanic crater lakes
Landforms of West Sumatra
Holocene stratovolcanoes